Nicolás "Nico" Olsak (born 25 November 1991) is an Argentine footballer who plays as a midfielder for Maccabi Herzliya.

Early life
Olsak was born into a family of American Jewish descent in Buenos Aires, Argentina. When Olsak was 12 years old, his parents, Marcelo and Gabriella, decided to move the family to Boca Raton, Florida, in the United States.

College career
After high school, Olsak went to Belmont University.

Club career
Olsak arrived in Israel as a tourist on Birthright. After a successful trial, he joined Maccabi Kabilo Jaffa. The following year he moved to Ironi Ramat Hasharon. In his third year in Israel, Olsak signed with Premier League club Maccabi Netanya.

After four seasons, and with his contract expiring, Olsak visited the training grounds of Maccabi Netanya on 29 June 2020 to say goodbye to his former teammates and coaches before returning to the United States as a free agent. Shortly after, he signed with RKC Waalwijk of the Dutch Eredivisie.

On 8 February 2021, Olsak joined Beitar Jerusalem, signing a contract until the end of the 2020–21 season.

Personal life
Olsak holds Argentine, Israeli and Polish citizenships. In 2020, Olsak got engaged to Tali Shimon, an American of Israeli descent from Florida.

Career statistics

Club

Honours and achievements

Maccabi Netanya
Maccabi Netanya
 Liga Leumit: 2016–17

References

1991 births
Living people
Argentine Jews
Israeli footballers
Jewish Argentine sportspeople
Footballers from Buenos Aires
Belmont Bruins men's soccer players
Maccabi Jaffa F.C. players
Hapoel Nir Ramat HaSharon F.C. players
Maccabi Netanya F.C. players
RKC Waalwijk players
Beitar Jerusalem F.C. players
Maccabi Petah Tikva F.C. players
Hapoel Hadera F.C. players
Maccabi Herzliya F.C. players
Liga Leumit players
Israeli Premier League players
Eredivisie players
Argentine emigrants to Israel
Argentine expatriate sportspeople in the Netherlands
Israeli expatriate sportspeople in the Netherlands
Association football midfielders